Kenilworth is a commuter railroad station in Kenilworth, Illinois, a small and affluent village in the North Shore area of Chicago. Metra's Union Pacific North Line trains go south to Ogilvie Transportation Center in Chicago and as far north as Kenosha, Wisconsin. In Metra's zone-based fare schedule, Kenilworth is in zone D. As of 2018, Kenilworth is the 98th busiest of Metra's 236 non-downtown stations, with an average of 501 weekday boardings.

The station is on Kenilworth Avenue between Green Bay Road and Richmond Road. Northbound trains stop on the west platform, and southbound trains stop on the east platform. Travel time to Ogilvie ranges from 28 minutes on express trains to 38 minutes on local trains. It is also across the street from the Kenilworth Village Hall, which has the Green Bay Trail in the front yard.

As of December 5, 2022, Kenilworth is served by 57 trains (29 inbound and 28 outbound) on weekdays, by 11 trains in each direction on Saturdays, and by eight trains in each direction on Sundays.

The station was built in 1891 by the Chicago and North Western Railway to a design by architect Franklin Pierce Burnham of the firm Edbrooke and Burnham.

Bus connections
Pace
  213 Green Bay Road

References

External links

Station from Kenilworth Avenue from Google Maps Street View

Metra stations in Illinois
Former Chicago and North Western Railway stations
Railway stations in Cook County, Illinois
Railway stations in the United States opened in 1891
1891 establishments in Illinois
Kenilworth, Illinois
Union Pacific North Line